Cuphead is a video game developed and published by Studio MDHR. The game follows the titular Cuphead who, in a deal with the Devil after losing a game at the Devil's casino, is sent on a quest to repossess the souls of runaway debtors as payment for Cuphead's loss. In the game, up to two players control Cuphead and/or his brother Mugman to fight through several levels and boss fights; the game does not have a rigid narrative structure. As the game progresses, the protagonist acquires more power and abilities, eventually threatening the Devil himself. Players, however, can only equip a limited number of these abilities at a given time.

The game's creators, brothers Chad and Jared Moldenhauer, took inspiration from the rubber hose style of the golden age of American animation and the surrealist qualities of works of Walt Disney Animation Studios, Fleischer Studios, Warner Bros. Cartoons, MGM Cartoon Studio and Walter Lantz Productions. Reminiscent of the '30s aesthetics and Jazz Age, the game is noted for its animation and soundtrack: all in-game assets used hand-drawn animation with deliberate human imperfections, and the soundtrack was written for and recorded with a full jazz ensemble.

Cuphead was announced in 2010, had a preview at E3 2014, and was released in 2017 as a timed-exclusive for Microsoft's Windows and Xbox One, with ports to other systems subsequently added. The game was a commercial success, selling two million copies within two weeks of release and six million in two years. Cuphead received widespread critical acclaim, with praises for its art style, gameplay, soundtrack, and difficulty; the latter was singled out for scrutiny, with multiple outlets naming Cuphead one of the hardest video games ever created. The game won several awards, including three Game Awards, three D.I.C.E. Awards, and a British Academy Games Award. A DLC expansion, entitled Cuphead: The Delicious Last Course, was released on June 30, 2022. A Netflix animated series based on the game, The Cuphead Show!, premiered in February 2022.

Gameplay 

Cupheads gameplay is centered on continual boss fights, interspersed with run-and-gun levels. Each is housed in one of four worlds, with the final fight against the Devil. Each boss fight includes a simple, regular, and expert difficulty mode (with the exception of the final two bosses, which lack a simple mode). Defeating a boss on normal mode is required to progress through the game and unlocks expert mode for that particular level. Most boss battles take place on land, although some involve player characters piloting aeroplanes and play like a side-scrolling shoot 'em up. The game includes role-playing elements and a branching level sequence. Player characters have infinite lives, maintaining all equipment between deaths. Equippable weapons and special abilities, referred to as Charms, can be purchased from Porkrind's Emporium, an in-game shop, using coins found in levels and the overworld. Player characters can use a slapping parry attack on objects marked in pink to various effects, the most important of them being a super meter charge that enables more powerful attacks. The super meter is represented by a row of five playing cards, and can also be charged through attacking or Charm effects. An enhanced attack can be executed at the cost of one card, with its particular form determined by the currently equipped weapon. The most powerful strikes, or Super Arts, require the Super Meter to be fully charged and will completely drain it upon use. Three Super Arts are available, one in each of the first three worlds; to earn each one, the player must enter a mausoleum and parry a horde of ghosts to stop them from reaching an urn at the center of the screen.

After completing a level, the players are ranked with a grade based on performance, determined by the time taken to complete the level, damage taken, number of parried attacks, and the number of times part of the super meter was used, in addition to the level difficulty. The levels are accessible through a top-down perspective overworld with its own secret areas. The game has a two-player local cooperative mode, in which either player character can return to the game after being killed if the other one parries his soul before it rises off the screen. Cuphead's brother, Mugman, acts as an alternative skin and potential co-op partner within the game. The DLC expansion, Delicious Last Course, adds a new area with its own campaign, including new bosses, weapons, and Charms; a third playable character is also added, Ms. Chalice, who replaces either Cuphead or Mugman when equipped with the Astral Cookie Charm. Ms. Chalice has her own unique set of moves, including a double jump, an invincible roll maneuver, and a parry dash.

Plot

Don't Deal With the Devil
On Inkwell Isle, Cuphead and his brother, Mugman, are two fun-loving children who live under the watchful eye of Elder Kettle. Despite Elder Kettle's warnings, the brothers wander off to the Devil's Casino and begin playing craps. When they go on a winning streak, the Devil appears and makes a deal, offering to give them all the money in the casino if they win the next roll and threatening to take their souls if they lose. Cuphead accepts the offer and loses by rolling snake eyes. As he and Mugman beg for mercy, the Devil offers them another deal: if they can collect the "soul contracts" from his runaway debtors by midnight the next day, the brothers will be spared. Cuphead and Mugman return to Elder Kettle, who gives them a magic potion that allows them to fire blasts of energy from their fingers, but also warns them that the debtors may not turn in their soul contracts willingly.

The brothers travel around the neighboring Inkwell Isles, fighting the debtors in order to obtain their contracts. As they enter the second Isle, Elder Kettle notices that the duo are getting stronger from their battles, and urges them to "do the right thing" when they meet the Devil. After Cuphead and Mugman enter the third Isle, King Dice, the casino's manager, reports the cup brothers' progress to the Devil. King Dice soon becomes suspicious that they may be up to something, to which the Devil replies that there is nothing to worry about; if they were to try anything, he would be waiting for them.

The brothers soon collect all the soul contracts and return to the Devil's Casino. King Dice stops them, saying that their success has caused him to lose a bet and has the duo battle his minions as well as himself. After defeating King Dice, the brothers confront the Devil, who tries to tempt them by letting them join his team if they give him the soul contracts. If the player chooses to turn them over, Cuphead and Mugman are brainwashed into the Devil's demonic lackeys and the game ends. If they refuse, the Devil becomes furious at the brothers for not upholding their end of the bargain and attacks them. Cuphead and Mugman defeat the Devil, force him to surrender, burn the contracts, and return home. Learning that they have nothing to fear from the Devil anymore, the former debtors honor the brothers for their heroic actions.

The Delicious Last Course
After freeing a spirit known as the Legendary Chalice from one of the main game's mausoleums, Cuphead and Mugman receive a summons from her to visit a distant fourth Inkwell Isle. Once they arrive, Chalice demonstrates an "Astral Cookie" which allows her to trade places with the brother who eats it, turning him into a ghost and temporarily bringing her back to life as Ms. Chalice. The cookie's inventor, Chef Saltbaker, unveils his recipe for a special dessert known as the Wondertart, which has the power to give Chalice her own permanent body. Saltbaker notes that its required ingredients are held by several antagonistic inhabitants of the Island, and the brothers set out to collect them with Chalice's help.

Once they return to the bakery with the ingredients, they find Saltbaker in his cellar. He reveals that the Wondertart requires a living soul baked into it to work, and that he intends to use the Wondertart for himself and conquer the astral plane. To this end, he has captured the soul of one protagonist (who may be any character not in play upon reaching the bakery) and decides to dispatch of the other two to continue his scheme. One last battle begins and Saltbaker is eventually defeated, with his bakery being subsequently destroyed and leaving no way to finish the Wondertart. Unwilling to let anyone else give up their soul for her benefit, Chalice decides to remain a ghost and continue searching for a way to return to life, while offering to continue helping Cuphead and Mugman when they need it via the Astral Cookie. In the epilogue, Saltbaker is arrested for his crimes and sentenced to community service. After serving his sentence, Saltbaker reforms, makes amends for his actions and rebuilds his bakery, much to everyone's joy.

Development 

Cuphead is the first game by Studio MDHR, a Canadian indie game development studio founded by brothers Chad and Jared Moldenhauer. The brothers wound up remortgaging their house to finish the game. The game was written by Evan Skolnick; additional animation work was contributed by Jake Clark, with programming led by Tony Coculuzzi. Its development began in 2010 using the Unity game engine, and it was developed from the brothers' homes in Oakville, Ontario and Regina, Saskatchewan, respectively. It was inspired by cartoons from the early days of golden age of American animation such as Disney and Fleischer Studios, along with cartoonists Ub Iwerks, Grim Natwick, and Willard Bowsky. Chad Moldenhauer called Fleischer Studios "the magnetic north of his art style", and particularly sought to mimic their "subversive and surrealist" elements.

The Moldenhauers watched many early golden-age cartoons in their youth, largely from VHS compilations supplied by their parents. Among other siblings in their Regina, Saskatchewan childhood home, the two shared an interest in video games. They attempted a game in the style of Cuphead in 2000, but lacked the tools to continue. The brothers decided to try again following the success of the indie game Super Meat Boy, which was released in 2010. The character that became Cuphead descended from a 1936 Japanese propaganda animated film featuring a character with a teacup for a head. The Moldenhauers emulated the animation because they found it strange, and "right away it stuck". Before settling on him as the main character, the brothers had created around one hundred fifty different character designs, including a kappa wearing a tophat and characters with a plate or fork for a head.

Their animation techniques are similar to those of these cartoons. Chad Moldenhauer, who had previously worked in graphic design, hand-drew the animations and painted the backgrounds using watercolors, colorizing them in Photoshop. The gameplay's frame rate is 60 frames per second, while the animation runs at 24 per second, which is the standard in American film. Chad Moldenhauer saw the deliberately included human imperfections of their art design as a reaction to the perfectionism of modern pixel art. Jared Moldenhauer worked on other aspects of the game, and they discussed gameplay design together. Their studio hired a Romanian developer, a Brooklyn animator, and an Ontario jazz musician for the project. They sought to use recording processes vintage to that era. The score was composed by Kristofer Maddigan and consists of fifty one tracks performed by jazz and big band musicians.

The Moldenhauers described Cuphead as having a difficult, "retro game" core for its emphasis on gameplay over plot. Kill Screen described the developers as "obsessed" with run-and-gun fundamentals of "animations and exploits and hitboxes". They made multiple revisions to many gameplay elements, including how gameplay actions feel at the edges of platforms and how long players are disabled after receiving damage. They planned multiple difficulty levels and chose to abandon a typical damsel in distress plot for one where Cuphead perpetually creates trouble for himself. The developers planned to surpass the Guinness World Record for number of boss battles in a run-and-gun game by having more than 30, compared to the record's 25 in Alien Soldier. The game's implementation and visual design, combined with the limited number of staff, was Studio MDHR's biggest challenge, and as such the Moldenhauers went to great lengths to complete the game, even remortgaging their house in order to finance it.

Release 
Though the game was shown during the Xbox press event of Electronic Entertainment Expo 2014 to audience approval, it was not available to play and was estimated to be 40 percent complete. It was expected to be extended via expansion packs with 10 to 15 bosses each, similar to how Sonic & Knuckles added atop the Sonic series. Cuphead was released on September 29, 2017 for Windows and Xbox One, and it supports Xbox Play Anywhere. King Features Syndicate has the licensing rights to merchandise and assorted paraphernalia. 

Downloadable content for the game, The Delicious Last Course, which adds a new island, boss encounters, and a third playable character (Ms. Chalice), was revealed at E3 2018 for release in 2019. However, the new content was pushed back into 2020 to avoid putting too much pressure and crunch time on the development team. It was further delayed due to the COVID-19 pandemic and was eventually released on June 30, 2022.

A port of Cuphead for macOS was released on October 19, 2018, and advertised with an animated short titled Crisp Apples.

A port for the Nintendo Switch was released on April 18, 2019. This was made possible when Microsoft approached the development team about it. A PlayStation 4 port was released on July 28, 2020.

In June 2019, a port for Tesla, Inc.'s Linux-based operating system for some of its cars was announced by Tesla CEO Elon Musk, who expressed his appreciation of the game. It was released in September 2019 as part of Tesla's software version 10, though only the first level was playable.

Reception 

Ben Kuchera of Polygon wrote that Cuphead was one of the five most interesting reveals at Microsoft's E3 2014 press conference, even though he knew little about the game apart from its aesthetic. He said it "stood out immediately" and that everyone in the website's press room viscerally reacted to the trailer. Cuphead won the IGN Best Xbox One game at E3 award in 2015, and "Best Indie Game" at the Gamescom 2015 Awards. It was nominated as "Best Independent Game" at the E3 2016 Game Critics Awards.

Cuphead received "generally favorable" reviews, according to review aggregator Metacritic. Its difficulty was noted by several media outlets. Destructoid'''s Brett Makedonski welcomed the high difficulty, which he noted as "tough but fair". Based on "exhaustive" pattern recognition, he said it ultimately relied on muscle memory, rather than reaction. He thought structuring the game around boss battles was well executed, and that each boss encounter held "different and special and memorable" traits. Praising the 1930s aesthetics as cohesive, he found the jazz-based soundtrack to be "similarly fabulous". He said the "eight-direction firing radius" was "clunky and awkward". Though dying 188 times in his playthrough, Ray Carsillo at EGMNow was not frustrated by the difficulty, but rather was motivated to "dig my heels in deeper". He lauded the "gorgeous" hand-drawn visuals, surpassed only by the gameplay which goes "beyond pattern recognition". Peter Brown of GameSpot opined that combating enemies provided a considerably rewarding experience. He described the cartoon aesthetic as charming, infusing "color and expression", and a "true recreation" of hand-drawn cel animation. He relished the quick loading times which serve trial and error tactics. Though he saw "the fear of the unexpected" as part of Cupheads thrill, he disparaged its failure to identify progress and capability.

Lucas Sullivan at GamesRadar+ wrote that Cuphead "stands tall among the best 2D shooters of all time", and that the gameplay demands patient pattern recognition, but which is not frustrating and would reward players "tenfold". Sullivan called the animation adorable, with a wealth of detail in the watercolor backdrops, which worked well with the gameplay. Giant Bombs Ben Pack remarked that playing the game yielded one of his most enjoyable gaming experiences, citing the combination of "brutal" platforming and an "exceptionally well realized" art style. Joe Skrebels of IGN declared every scene a "masterwork" and commended the sound work, calling it an "ideal match" to the aesthetics. He called platforming battles the most imaginative part, and the lack of enemy health bars its "smartest" and "most devilish" feature. He found the battles rewarding and "one of Cupheads greatest strengths". He said the "run 'n' gun, left-to-right platforming" lacked inventiveness, and criticized the "parry system" and control scheme. Chris Schilling of PC Gamer liked the "reliable jump and dash" controls with "nimble and responsive" handling. Schilling explained that certain random elements meant "you can't simply learn patterns by rote and rely entirely on muscle memory". Chris Plante of Polygon said the game educates the player in strategy through trial and error. He enjoyed the "crucial" and "relatively forgiving" parrying system, more than the various attacks. He complained that the final bosses diminished the game's greatest features, and that the difficulty "eventually goes too far". Colm Ahern of VideoGamer.com wrote, "Cuphead will best most games in how it looks and sounds, and defeating that boss that you once deemed unbeatable is glorious." He criticized the final bosses, saying that the challenge was "a step too far".Unwinnable writer Yussef Cole wrote an essay titled "Cuphead and the Racist Spectre of Fleischer Animation", arguing that by using the rubber hose animation style, Studio MDHR also brought up the "bigotry and prejudice" that had a strong influence on early animation, claiming that Studio MDHR ignored the context and history of the aesthetic it "so faithfully" replicated. Cole states that much of the imagery that Studio MDHR took from the Fleischer style effectively carried the racial stereotypes of the 1930s Harlem and minstrel shows that the animation style was built on. Chad and Jared Moldenhauer had stated prior to release that they wanted to make an animation style that harkened back to 1930s cartoons without getting ties to racism or minstrel shows in them. Maja Moldenhauer further stated that all they wanted from the Fleischers was the animation style and visuals, and are "not versed in" anything else happening in that era. In response to Cole's essay, Brandon Orselli of Niche Gamer defended the game as a tribute to that art style, writing that it was not meant to deliver narratives, or "go anywhere beyond where it needs to go in terms of its basic and child-like storytelling".

Sales
In the two first weeks of release, more than one million copies of Cuphead were sold worldwide. Sales reached more than four million by July 2019, and five million by its second anniversary of release. By the time it was released for the PlayStation 4 in July 2020, it had reached 6 million sales. Cuphead: The Delicious Last Course accumulated a total of one million sales within less than two weeks of its launch.

AwardsEntertainment Weekly placed Cuphead fifth on the list of its "Best Games of 2017", GamesRadar+ ranked it ninth on its list of the 25 Best Games of 2017", and Polygon ranked it 14th on its list of the "50 best games of 2017". In Game Informers Reader's Choice Best of 2017 Awards, the game won the "Best Microsoft Game" and "Best Co-op Multiplayer" categories, and got third place for "Best Action Game". The website also gave it the awards for "Best Microsoft Exclusive" in its "Best of 2017 Awards", and for "Best Bosses" in its 2017 Action Game of the Year Awards. EGMNow ranked the game at #2 on its list of the 25 best games of 2017, and Ben "Yahtzee" Croshaw of Zero Punctuation ranked it third on his list of the Best Games of 2017. The Verge named it one of its 15 best video games of 2017.Cuphead was nominated for "Breakout Game of the Year" in PC Gamers 2017 Game of the Year Awards, and won the award for "Best Xbox One Game" in Destructoids Game of the Year Awards 2017. It won "Best Xbox One Game" and "Best Art Direction" in IGN's Best of 2017 Awards, whereas its other nominations were for "Game of the Year", "Best PC Game", "Best Platformer", "Best Original Music", and "Best Multiplayer". It won "Best Looking Game" and "Best Style", and was runner-up for "Best Shopkeeper" for the character Porkrind, "Best Music", "Best Debut", and "Game of the Year" at Giant Bomb Game of the Year 2017 Awards. The game won all six awards for "Animation, Artistic", "Art Direction, Period Influence", "Character Design", "Control Precision", "Game, Original Family" and "Original Light Mix Score, New IP" at the 17th Annual NAVGTR Awards, while The Delicious Last Course was nominated for the "Outstanding Animation, Artistic", "Outstanding Art Direction, Period Influence", "Outstanding Character Design", "Outstanding Game, Franchise Family", and "Outstanding Original Light Mix Score, Franchise" awards at the 22nd Annual NAVGTR Awards, winning only three of them ("Outstanding Animation, Artistic", "Outstanding Game, Franchise Family", and "Outstanding Original Light Mix Score, Franchise").

In the week of September 14, 2019, the album Selected Tunes from Cuphead topped the Jazz Albums Billboard charts.

 Legacy 
A Cuphead Mii Fighter costume was added to the 2018 fighting game Super Smash Bros. Ultimate via downloadable content in January 2020. It also came bundled with one of the game's boss level themes, "Floral Fury". Four Cuphead-themed "spirits" were added to Super Smash Bros. Ultimate in February 2020. Later in 2020, Arby's added limited-edition toys and papercrafts based on some characters from the game to its kids' menu at select locations. A tabletop game, Cuphead: Fast Rolling Dice Game, was released in 2021, featuring a companion app for iOS and Android that plays music and calculates the score.

 The Cuphead Show! The Cuphead Show!'', an animated series based on the game and produced by Netflix Animation, was announced in July 2019. The show does not use pen-and-paper animation methods like the game and instead uses digital animation. Chad and Jared Moldenhauer serve as executive producers alongside CJ Kettler from King Features Syndicate. The series premiered on February 18, 2022. On August 19, 2022, the 13-episode second season was released worldwide. The 11-episode third season was released on November 18, 2022.

Notes

References

External links 
 

2017 video games
Annie Award winners
Cooperative video games
Indie video games
MacOS games
Multiplayer and single-player video games
Nintendo Switch games
PlayStation 4 games
Retro-style video games
Run and gun games
Fiction about the Devil
Video games with alternate endings
Video games with downloadable content
Video games developed in Canada
Windows games
Xbox One games
Xbox Play Anywhere games
Video games about demons
Video games set in amusement parks
Video games set on fictional islands
Video games adapted into television shows
Video games adapted into novels
Video games adapted into comics
The Game Awards winners
BAFTA winners (video games)
Shoot 'em ups